Amsterdam Density Functional (ADF) is a program for first-principles electronic structure calculations that makes use of density functional theory (DFT). ADF was first developed in the early seventies by the group of E. J. Baerends from the Vrije Universiteit in Amsterdam, and by the group of T. Ziegler from the University of Calgary. Nowadays many other academic groups are contributing to the software. Software for Chemistry & Materials (SCM), formerly known as Scientific Computing & Modelling is a spin-off company from the Baerends group. SCM has been coordinating the development and distribution of ADF since 1995. Together with the rise in popularity of DFT in the nineties, ADF has become a popular computational chemistry software package used in the industrial and academic research. ADF excels in spectroscopy, transition metals, and heavy elements problems. A periodic structure counterpart of ADF named BAND is available to study bulk crystals, polymers, and surfaces. The Amsterdam Modeling Suite has expanded beyond DFT since 2010, with the semi-empirical MOPAC code, the Quantum_ESPRESSO plane wave code, a density-functional based tight binding (DFTB) module, a reactive force field module ReaxFF, and an implementation of Klamt's  COSMO-RS method, which also includes COSMO-SAC, UNIFAC, and QSPR.

Specific features and capabilities
See ADF website for a comprehensive listing.

 Slater-type orbitals (STOs) as basis functions for both molecular and periodic calculations, in contrast to Gaussian orbitals (GTOs) and plane waves in other codes.
 Basis sets and relativistic methods (zeroth order regular approximation to the Dirac equation (ZORA), X2C: scalar relativistic and spin-orbit coupling) for all the chemical elements up to no. 118.
 Various molecular properties: IR, Raman, VCD, UV, XAS spectra;  NMR and EPR (ESR) parameters.
 Solvent and environmental effects via COSMO, QM/MM, DRF, subsystem DFT.
 Many chemical analysis tools (energy decomposition analysis, transfer integrals, (partial) density of states, etc.)
 Periodic DFT with atomic orbitals: 1D, 2D, 3D and a graphical interface to plane wave code Quantum ESPRESSO
 Thermodynamic properties of solvents and solutions (Solubility, LogP, VLE, LLE) with COSMO-RS
 Semi-empirical modules MOPAC and DFTB]
 Parallelized ReaxFF with GUI for reactive molecular dynamics

 Integrated graphical user interface (GUI) for all modules to set up calculations and visualize the results.
 Out-of-the-box parallel calculations via IntelMPI, OpenMPI or native MPI. Limited GPU support

See also
 Quantum chemistry computer programs

References

External links
 Software for Chemistry & Materials

Computational chemistry software
Density functional theory software
Molecular modelling software
Molecular dynamics software